The 1998 Richmond upon Thames Council election took place on 7 May 1998 to elect members of Richmond upon Thames London Borough Council in London, England. The whole council was up for election and the Liberal Democrats stayed in overall control of the council.

Election result

Ward results

References

1998 London Borough council elections
1998